Halim Begaj (born 29 November 1985) is an Albanian footballer who most recently played as a defender for Labëria FC in the Kategoria e Dytë.

Honours
Flamurtari
Albanian First Division (1): 2005-06
Albanian Cup (2): 2008-09, 2013–14

Labëria
Kategoria e Tretë (1): 2020

References

External links
 
 
 
 
 Profile at FSHF

1985 births
Living people
Footballers from Vlorë
Albanian footballers
Association football defenders
Flamurtari Vlorë players
KS Pogradeci players
KF Vllaznia Shkodër players
KS Sopoti Librazhd players
KF Korabi Peshkopi players
Kategoria Superiore players